The Dunhuang railway is a branch of the Lanzhou–Xinjiang railway in Gansu Province, China. It runs  from Liugou railway station in Guazhou County, on the main line, to the terminus at Dunhuang railway station. Construction, at a cost of 640 million yuan, started on 7 September 2004. The first service to Dunhuang ran on 3 March 2006.

Station list

See also
 Golmud–Dunhuang railway
 Mogao Caves

References

Railway lines in China
Rail transport in Gansu
Dunhuang
Railway lines opened in 2006